Peter Hodgson may refer to:

Peter E. Hodgson (1928–2008), British physicist
Pete Hodgson (born 1950), New Zealand politician
Peter Hodgson, bass player for Jon and Lee & the Checkmates and Rhinoceros
Sneezy Waters (Peter Hodgson, born 1945), Canadian singer
Peter C. Hodgson (born 1944), American theologian